Speedway Miramichi is a 1/3-mile short track located in Miramichi, New Brunswick. The track originally opened as a dirt track called Douglastown Speedway but was paved in 1968. The track closed a few years after opening in 1974. The track was reopened as Williston Speedway. The track ran races with large crowds for years as the track continued improvements. The track also went through several name changes including McKay's Speedway and Miramichi Speedway. In 1997 the track was sold to Reg Tozer and renamed Miramichi City Speedway. Shortly after, the track started running demolition events instead of stock car racing. The track shut down following the 2009 season. The track sat dormant for two seasons with the exception of one race weekend in September each year. In late 2011, the track was sold to Jason Carnahan and David Neilson. The owners renamed the track Speedway Miramichi and have made continuous improvements to the facility, which is currently running 5–6 races per season. The track once had a well known sportsman race called the Brunswick 100.

References

External links
 Speedway Miramichi

Buildings and structures in Miramichi, New Brunswick
Paved oval racing venues in Canada
Sport in Miramichi, New Brunswick
Sports venues in New Brunswick